MacFadyen is a Scottish patronymic surname meaning "son of little Patrick".  The Celtic prefix "Mac" means "son of", while "Fadyen" is a derivative of the Gaelic Pháidín, meaning "little Patrick". It is a variant of the surname McFadden, which has other variants. People with the surname include:

 Allan Macfadyen (1860–1907), Scottish bacteriologist
 Angus Macfadyen (born 1963), Scottish actor 
 Christie MacFadyen, Canadian actress
 Donnie Macfadyen (born 1979), Scottish rugby player
 Donald Macfadyen, Lord Macfadyen (1945–2008), Scottish lawyer and judge
 Elmer MacFadyen (1943–2007), Canadian politician
 Gavin MacFadyen (1940–2016), American investigative journalist
 Ian Macfadyen, (born 1942), British retired Air Marshal
 Matthew Macfadyen (born 1974), English actor
 Ross Macfadyen, Scottish broadcast professional
 Willie MacFadyen (1904–1971), Scottish football player and manager

See also
 McFadden (surname)
 McFadyen (surname)

References

Patronymic surnames